is a 1995 off-road racing arcade game developed and published by Namco.

Gameplay
Dirt Dash is an off-road racing game.

Reception

In Japan, Game Machine listed Dirt Dash on their February 15, 1996 issue as being the third most-successful dedicated arcade game of the month. Next Generation reviewed the arcade version of the game, rating it four stars out of five, and stated that "Essentially, Dirt Dash is to Sega Rally what Tekken is to Virtua Fighter, and with its attractive use of the Super System 22 board, light-sourcing and backgrounds, plus the excellent feel of the cars themselves, Namco has another hit on its hands."

Reviews
Console Plus
Game Power
Game Players

Notes

References

External links
 Dirt Dash at Killer List of Videogames

1995 video games
Arcade video games
Arcade-only video games
Namco arcade games
Racing video games
Video games developed in Japan